Miraflores Airport  is an airport serving La Palma, a port town and the capital of the Darién Province of Panama.

There is rising terrain to the west.

Airlines and destinations

See also
Transport in Panama
List of airports in Panama

References

External links
OpenStreetMap - Miraflores
FallingRain - Miraflores Airport

Airports in Panama